Lemonhead is an American brand of candy that was first introduced in 1962, produced by the Ferrara Candy Company. Lemonheads are a round, lemon-flavored candy consisting of a sweet coating, soft sour shell, and a hard candy core. Popular varieties are Grapeheads, Cherryheads and Appleheads.

Inspiration for the Lemonhead name came from Salvatore Ferrara seeing his grandson, Salvatore II, the third generation, after delivery. Salvatore II was a forceps baby and he noted that his new grandson's head was lemon-shaped.
The candy was born out of the same cold panned process as the company's Red Hots in 1962. In this process, layer after layer of sugar and flavors are added until the candy reaches the desired shape and size. They are most commonly sold in their standard 1 centimeter size, but they are also produced in a single-sale 3 cm version. Lemonhead candies are gluten and fat-free. Ferrara now makes 500 million Lemonheads per year.

Some time between the 1980s and late 1990s, Ferrara Pan brought all of their fruit-flavored candies under a consistent naming convention: Lemonheads, Grapeheads (formerly Alexander the Grape), Cherryheads (formerly Cherry Chan/Cherry Clan) and Appleheads (formerly Johnny Apple Treats).

Other candies under the brand
Grapeheads
Cherryheads
Appleheads
Orangeheads
Chewy Lemonheads and Friends (including Lemonheads, Grapeheads, Cherryheads, Appleheads, and Orangeheads)
Chewy Lemonheads Tropical
Chewy Lemonheads Fruit Mix
Chewy Lemonheads Flavor Fusers
Lemonhead Gummies
JuicyHeads
BlueRaspberryheads (Discontinued)
Raspberryheads
BlackRaspberryheads (Discontinued)
LoveHeads (Discontinued)

Commercial success
Lemonhead candies have been commercially successful since their inception. Lemonheads and other sour candy can also be attributed an increase in growth in non-chocolate confectioners’ sales as opposed to chocolate companies’ sales in the 2015 fiscal year. CEO of Ferrara Candy, Todd Siwak, said, “We are seeing a desire in Millennials for cherry gummy candy, especially with sour, sweet, and intense flavors”.

Appearance in popular culture

Advertisements
Being the product of a Chicago company, Ferrara Pan was a prominent sponsor of The Bozo Show on WGN-TV (along with its national superstation feed), with Lemonhead specifically promoted, and a gift package of various Ferrara Pan candies often being given as a close-bucket prize during the "Grand Prize Game".

In the 1980s, Lemonhead candy advertisements were mostly centered around sports. The commercials followed a similar pattern and featured a children's sports team; the player who made a mistake would be labeled the "lemonhead". 
In the 2010s, Lemonhead candy commercials featured athletes as well as the Lemonhead mascot. The mascot was pictured alongside popular athletes scoring in games or otherwise achieving athletic success. 
In 2014, the company rebranded the mascot to feature a more mature figure as the face of Lemonhead candies.

The Sugar Estate at Breckenridge
Lemonheads and other Ferrara candies served as the inspiration for Alana Ferrara's recently opened Sugar Estate at Breckenridge. The Estate is a luxury cabin decorated with Ferrara candies, including Lemonheads. Artist Andy Thomas painted 20 Lemonhead candies across the cabin to inspire guests to find them all.

Controversy

2014 rebrand
In 2014 it was reported that Lemonhead candies were undergoing a rebrand that included updated packaging and a new mascot. While the company's marketing department said the mascot would be losing his little boy image, the mascot came under heavy scrutiny for supposedly appearing “creepy” and for lacking appropriate social media savvy. The public largely agreed and the new mascot became the subject of ridicule across popular social media platforms.

Lawsuit
Ferrara Candy Company came under fire in 2017 because of their Lemonheads due to the opaque packaging. A lawsuit was filed claiming that customers had been deceived into believing there was more product in the boxes than there actually were because of the packaging. The Ferrara Candy Company settled for $2.5 million with the plaintiff and agreed to provide cash payment for those who were impacted and to modify quality control procedure.

Health uses
Lemonheads are sometimes recommended by pregnant women and parenting bloggers for the relief of nausea commonly caused by morning sickness during pregnancy. Those undergoing chemotherapy are also sometimes advised to suck on Lemonheads or other sour lemon candies, as these promote salivation.

See also
 List of confectionery brands
 Sherbet lemon

References

Ferrara Candy Company brands
Brand name confectionery
Products introduced in 1962